Meepawala is a village located in Southern Province, Sri Lanka at , roughly 10 km away from Galle. It comprises to Bope-Poodala Divisional Secretary's domain. Cities, towns and places near Meepawala include Poddala, Holuwagoda, Narawala, and Baddegama. Meepawala Amarasooriya College is the national school in the village.

Populated places in Southern Province, Sri Lanka